The 99th Regiment of Foot (Jamaica Regiment) was an infantry regiment of the British Army, raised in 1780 by Charles Rainsforth and disbanded in 1783.

It was raised in the Midlands for service in the West Indies, and spent three years (1780 to 1783) stationed in Jamaica as a garrison unit before being returned to England to be disbanded.

Lieutenant General Robert Skene was Colonel of the Regimant from 1781 to 1783. William Neville Gardiner became a colonel the following year.

References

Infantry regiments of the British Army
Military units and formations established in 1780
Military units and formations disestablished in 1783
1780 establishments in Great Britain
1783 disestablishments in Great Britain
18th century in Jamaica
Military history of Jamaica
1780 establishments in the British Empire
1783 disestablishments in the British Empire